Riding the Edge is a 1989 film directed by James Fargo and starring Raphael Sbarge and Catherine Mary Stewart.

Synopsis
When his scientist father is kidnapped by Middle-Eastern terrorists, Matt Harman (Raphael Sbarge), a championship motocross contestant, is designated by his dad's captors as the ideal courier. Western governments agree that the boy can serve as a go-between, and he is all prepared to deliver a special computer chip to the terrorists. He is accompanied in his travels by lovely female secret agent Maggie Cole (Catherine Mary Stewart) and a local Middle Eastern boy who has the rare distinction of also being royalty. Together, they work to save Matt's father and defeat the terrorists.

Cast
Raphael Sbarge as Matt Harman
Catherine Mary Stewart as Maggie Cole
James Fargo as Tarek

References

External links

1989 films
Films directed by James Fargo
1980s English-language films